Ginsenosides or panaxosides are a class of natural product steroid glycosides and triterpene saponins. Compounds in this family are found almost exclusively in the plant genus Panax (ginseng), which has a long history of use in traditional medicine that has led to the study of pharmacological effects of ginseng compounds. As a class, ginsenosides exhibit a large variety of subtle and difficult-to-characterize biological effects when studied in isolation.

Ginsenosides can be isolated from various parts of the plant, though typically from the roots, and can be purified by column chromatography. The chemical profiles of Panax species are distinct; although Asian ginseng, Panax ginseng, has been most widely studied due to its use in traditional Chinese medicine, there are ginsenosides unique to American ginseng (Panax quinquefolius) and Japanese ginseng (Panax japonicus). Ginsenoside content also varies significantly due to environmental effects.

Classification
Ginsenosides are named according to their retention factor in thin layer chromatography (TLC). They can be broadly divided into two groups based on the carbon skeletons of their aglycones: the four-ring dammarane family, which contains the majority of known ginsenosides, and the oleanane family. The dammaranes further subdivided into 2 main groups, the protopanaxadiols and protopanaxatriols, with other smaller groups such as the ocotillol-type pseudoginsenoside F11 and its derivatives.

Chemical structure
Most known ginsenosides are classified as members of the dammarane family. The structure of these dammarane ginsenosides consists of a 4-ring, steroid-like structure. To each ginsenoside is bound at least 2 or 3 hydroxyl groups at the carbon-3 and -20 positions or the carbon-3, -6, and -20 positions respectively. In protopanaxadiols, sugar groups attach to the 3-position of the carbon skeleton, while in comparison sugar groups attach to the carbon-6 position in protopanaxatriols. Well known protopanaxadiols include Rb1, Rb2, Rg3, Rh2, and Rh3. Well known protopanaxatriols include Rg1, Rg2, and Rh1.

Ginsenosides that are a member of the oleanane family are pentacyclic, composed of a five ring carbon skeleton.

Biosynthesis
The biosynthetic pathway of ginsenosides is not entirely characterized, though as steroids they derive from pathways that lead to the synthesis of isoprene units. A proposed pathway converts squalene to 2,3-oxidosqualene via the action of squalene epoxidase, at which point dammaranes can be synthesized through dammarenediol synthase, oleananes through beta-amyrin synthase, and another class of molecules, the phytosterols, through cycloartenol synthase.

In the proposed pathway, squalene is synthesized from the assembly of two farnesyl diphosphate (FPP) molecules. Each molecule of FPP is in turn the product of two molecules of dimethylallyl diphosphate and two molecules of isopentenyl diphosphate (IPP). IPP is produced by the mevalonic pathway in the cytosol of a ginseng plant cell and by the methylerythritol phosphate pathway in the plant's plastid.

Ginsenosides likely serve as mechanisms for plant defense. Ginsenosides have been found to have both antimicrobial and antifungal properties. Ginsenoside molecules are naturally bitter-tasting and discourage insects and other animals from consuming the plant.

Metabolism
Ginseng is generally consumed orally as a dietary supplement, and thus its component ginsenosides may be metabolized by gut flora. For example, ginsenosides Rb1 and Rb2 are converted to 20-b-O-glucopyranosyl-20(S)-protopanaxadiol or 20(S)-protopanaxadiol by human gut bacteria. This process is known to vary significantly between individuals. In some cases the metabolites of ginsenosides may be the biologically active compounds.

Biological effects
Most studies of the biological effects of ginsenosides have been in cell culture or animal models and thus their relevance to human biology is unknown. Effects on the cardiovascular system, central nervous system and immune system have been reported, primarily in rodents. Antiproliferative effects have also been described.

Many studies suggest that ginsenosides have antioxidant properties. Ginsenosides have been observed to increase internal antioxidant enzymes and act as a free-radical scavenger. Ginsenosides Rg3 and Rh2 have been observed in cell models as having an inhibitory effect on the cell growth of various cancer cells while studies in animal models have suggested that ginsenosides have neuroprotective properties and could be useful in treating neurodegenerative disease such as Alzheimer's and Parkinson's diseases.

Two broad mechanisms of action have been suggested for ginsenoside activity, based on their similarity to steroid hormones. They are amphiphilic and may interact with and change the properties of cell membranes. Some ginsenosides have also been shown to be partial agonists of steroid hormone receptors. It is not known how these mechanisms yield the reported biological effects of ginsenosides. The molecules as a class have low bioavailability due to both metabolism and poor intestinal absorption.

See also
 Gintonin
 Pseudoginsenoside F11

References

Saponins
Triterpene glycosides